Margaret Haughery (1813–1882) was a philanthropist known as "the mother of the orphans". Margaret Gaffney Haughery (pronounced as HAW -a- ree) was a beloved historical figure in New Orleans, Louisiana the 1880s. Widely known as "Our Margaret," “The Bread Woman of New Orleans" and "Mother of Orphans," Margaret devoted her life's work to the care and feeding of the poor and hungry, and to fund and build orphanages throughout the city.

An Irish immigrant widow woman of many titles, Margaret was also commonly referred to as the "Angel of the Delta," “Mother Margaret," “Margaret of New Orleans," the "Celebrated Margaret", "Head Mame",  and "Margaret of Tully." A Catholic, she worked closely with New Orleans Sisters of Charity, associated with the Roman Catholic Archdiocese of New Orleans.

She opened up four orphanages in the New Orleans area in the 19th century. Many years later in the 20th and 21st centuries, several of the asylums Margaret founded as places of shelter for orphans and widows evolved into homes for the elderly.

A woman of great charity, Margaret became famed for her lifelong championing of the destitute. Some people considered her a living saint worthy of canonisation. Born into poverty and orphaned at a young age, she began her adult life as a washwoman and a peddler – yet she died a businesswoman and philanthropist and received a state funeral.

Early life 

Margaret was born in a stone cottage in Ireland in 1813, the fifth child of William and Margaret O'Rourke Gaffney. Margaret's parents were from Tully South, in the parish of Carrigallen, County Leitrim. Her father had a small farm and was possibly a tailor.

in Ireland, 1816 was called "the year without a summer" and 1817 "the year of the malty flour". The year 1818 was one of high emigration due to a succession of wet summers followed by extreme winters. William, his wife Margaret, and three of their six children – including Margaret (then five), older brother Kevin and baby sister Kathleen – left Ireland for the United States. The three eldest children were to remain temporarily with their uncle Matthew O'Rourke in Ireland, until such time as they could be sent for. The final parting was so distressing that friends drew the children staying in Ireland aside, and before the divided family left Ireland they knelt to receive the curate's blessing.

Emigration to America 
The high seas journey by steamer took six months to reach America, as severe storms affected the ship's progress. Ship records reflect that the passengers despaired of ever reaching dry land again. At-sea provisions became so scarce that one passenger recalled that each person was allowed just one cracker a day. Almost all luggage was destroyed including the Gaffneys' trunk, whose lid Margaret's father then used to rock his young children. Eventually the ship reached Chesapeake Bay, then finally Baltimore. During the long voyage, a Welsh woman with the surname Richards became acquainted with the Gaffney family.

Shortly after the Gaffney family disembarked in Baltimore, Maryland, baby Kathleen died. Like all small tenant farmers of his era, Margaret's father William was ill-equipped for city life. His job opportunities were limited. Nevertheless, he secured employment as a carter at the Baltimore docks and soon sent money to his brother-in-law O'Rourke for the upkeep of his three children remaining in Ireland. He had almost saved enough to send for them when in 1822 a yellow fever epidemic ravaged Baltimore, claiming Margaret's parents, William and Margaret, who died within days of each other. They are buried in St. Patrick's cemetery in Baltimore. All household effects were burned, as was the custom, to prevent spread of the infection, with the exception of a prayer book, which was found twenty-seven years later and returned to the family.

Margaret, now nine, was homeless and soon alone as her older brother Kevin disappeared and was never heard from again. It is thought he may have gone out west. Mrs. Richards, who had made the overseas crossing with the Gaffney family heard of Margaret's plight. She had lost her husband to yellow fever. She took Margaret into her home. There Margaret remained for some years, where she worked for her keep. In fact she may have been little more than a servant. Margaret received no formal education, and never learned to read or write. When old enough, Margaret went into domestic service, which was common for Irishwomen in Baltimore at that time.

Marriage and move to New Orleans 
On 10 October 1835, at age 21, Margaret married Irish-born Charles Haughery at a ceremony in Baltimore Cathedral. To escape the cold weather up north, Margaret persuaded him that a change in climate might be therapeutic for his poor health. They left Baltimore on the ship Hyperion and reached New Orleans on 20 November 1835. Like other New Orleanians of the time, the young family suffered from rampant epidemics of yellow fever and cholera. For a time Charles's health showed a slight improvement but it was short-lived and medical advice recommended a sea journey.

Charles decided to go to Ireland, his native land. This trip was delayed by several months pending the birth of the couple's first child, a girl. They named her Frances. Eventually, Charles made the voyage but after some months Margaret received word that he died shortly after reaching his destination. Within a few months infant Frances became seriously ill and died. This was the second time that Margaret's family was wiped out, yet she was just 23 years of age. As she herself said, "My God! Thou hast broken every tie: Thou hast stripped me of all. Again I am all alone.”

At that time, the city was divided into three municipalities: the first being the French Quarter and Faubourg Tremé, the second being Uptown (then meaning all settled areas upriver from Canal Street) and the third being Downtown (the rest of the city from Esplanade Avenue on down river).

Despite her tragedies, or because of them, Margaret was determined to do something in her life to help the plight of widows and orphans — something she understood very well. The Sisters of Charity under the guidance of Sister Regis Barrett managed the Poydras Orphan Asylum (established by Julien de Lallande Poydras). Margaret would donate any extra money from her work at the laundry of the St Charles Hotel to the orphans. Eventually, she left her position at the hotel to work for the sisters as manager of the orphan asylum. When the orphans were without food she bought it for them from her earnings. The Female Orphan Asylum of the Sisters of Charity built in 1840 was financed from Margaret's work.

Businesswoman
During the yellow fever epidemic in New Orleans in the 1850s Margaret went about from house to house, without regard to race or creed, nursing the victims and consoling the dying mothers with the promise to look after their little ones. Eventually, She helped open the St. Theresa's Orphan Asylum on Camp Street. St. Theresa's Church was also practically built by Margaret, in conjunction with Sister Regis.

With money Margaret saved from her wages, she purchased two cows to supply milk for the children. She bought a small milk cart and sold the fresh surplus milk in the Vieux Carré (French Quarter). Soon she started a dairy with nineteen cows. The dairy prospered and was expanded. Margaret increased her stock and began selling cream and butter. Within two years Margaret had a dairy herd of forty cows and a profitable business. She became known among all classes as a businesswoman who sold her produce through the community from her handcart. She also underwrote the St Vincent de Paul Infant Asylum at Race and Magazine, which opened in 1862.

Although Margaret provided for the orphans, fed the poor, and gave generously to charity, her resources continued to grow. An industrious and resourceful woman determined to feed the orphans, at one point in time Margaret found employment at a bakery. Later on she loaned money to a baker but soon discovered that the business of Monsieur d' Aquin was on the verge of bankruptcy. She had become the main shareholder in the business. Margaret realised the only way she could recover her money was to take control of the bakery and operate it.

Known simply as Margaret's Bakery, the bakery business quickly became a success, and it is from this that she made the greater part of her fortune. For years she continued her rounds with the bread cart, which replaced the milk cart. Margaret provided for the home market and her produce was exported. All the asylums in New Orleans were supplied with bread from her bakery at such a low price as to be virtually free. Improvements to the bakery were always a priority. It became the first steam bakery in the south, providing employment for many. The bakery situated in New Levée Street was so successful that even the destruction so widespread in the South as a result of the Civil War had no effect on it.

Although she provided for orphans, fed the poor, and gave enormously in charity, her resources grew dramatically and Margaret's thriving bakery became famous. Margaret Haughery & Company, was the first steam bakery in the South. The bakery sold "Margaret's Bread" and she became the "Bread Woman of New Orleans". Eventually, she owned a popular store in the city called the Klotz Cracker Factory, associated with the Klotz Bakery.

The winos and beggars of the city used to converge on Levée Street. Margaret would not turn them away by. She always gave them a loaf of bread but cut it in half so that they could not sell it to buy alcohol.

Civil War 
The Civil War had a profound effect on New Orleans and greatly increased the number of orphans and people in need. Margaret made efforts to lessen the hardships by helping those who suffered from the wartime food shortage. To the hungry citizens of occupied New Orleans, Haughery gave wagonloads of bread and flour, fresh from her bakery.

When, in 1862,  the Union Army occupied New Orleans and put it under martial law in 1862, Commander, Union General Benjamin Franklin Butler, set up barriers and curfews. No one was to pass these barriers or be outside past the curfew. Margaret continued to distributed food and milk to the needy beyond the barriers. General Butler admonished her to stay behind the lines and that she would be shot or hung if she crossed them again. She asked the general if it was President Abraham Lincoln's will to starve the poor? General Butler replied, "You are not to go through the picket lines without my permission, is that clear?" "Quite clear," answered Margaret. To which Butler responded, "You have my permission."

During Reconstruction, she supported the Union efforts to keep peace in Louisiana as evidenced by the ceremonial sword she donated to US General C. Colon Augur, and which is part of the Louisiana State Museum's collection.

Life in New Orleans 

After the Civil War, during the Reconstruction Period she earned enough to build the big steam factory for her bread. By this time everybody in the city knew her. The children all over the city loved her; the businessmen were proud of her; the poor people all came to her for advice. She used to sit at the open door of her office, in a calico gown and little shawl, and give a good word to everybody, rich or poor. Fashion-gowned women, bankers, tradesmen and merchants sought Margaret's counsel.

Seated in the doorway of the bakery in the heart of the city, she became an integral part of its life, for, besides the poor who came to her continually, she was consulted by the people of all ranks about their business affairs, her wisdom having become proverbial. "Our Margaret" the people of New Orleans called her. The locals said she was masculine in energy and courage but gifted with the gentlest and kindest manners.

When Irish-born Margaret first disembarked into Antebellum New Orleans during the cotton-boom era of commerce, she along with other waves of new Irish immigrants sought work and opportunity in Louisiana. The city of contrasts was dubbed the city of fever and fortune, a port of pestilence and prosperity. Moving away from wharf work, Irish immigrant male labourers took jobs that slaves were judged too valuable to do, such as canal ditch-diggers, levee-builders and rail-hands laying tracks through swampland. During construction of the city's New Basin Canal (shipping canal), the Irish accepted the hazardous and backbreaking work for a $1 a day wages. Although no official death-toll records were kept, an estimated 20,000 (+/-) workers perished during the project, most buried on the spot. Many widows and orphans were left. Poor and living in slums, the Irish were particularly susceptible to a series of epidemics that periodically swept the city. The Great Famine of Ireland peaked and those fleeing Ireland found cheap passage to port-city New Orleans. Irish immigrants were drawn to Louisiana's Catholic traditions, first established when France and Spain ruled the territory, prior to the Louisiana Purchase. By 1860, 14 percent of New Orleans' population was Irish. The city was home to the third-largest Irish population in the country. Irish women were a unique female immigrant group, vulnerable to ethnic and cultural stereotyping, as single women often travelled and lived together in groups, atypical to the pre-existing framework for Southern ladies.

During Margaret's perilous and yet fruitful lifetime spent in New Orleans, mosquito-borne yellow fever epidemics remained a constant threat; during one three-year period alone, in 1853–55 the viral illness claimed 13,000. Margaret also braved and survived the 1856 Last Island Hurricane and the 1849 Mississippi River levee breach upriver from the city, the worst flooding the city had ever seen. The Sauvé's Crevasse flood left 12,000 homeless.

Orphanages built 

Some of the New Orleans orphanages Margaret the "Mother of Orphans" built were St. Elizabeth Orphan Asylum on Napoleon Ave., the Louise Home on Clio Street for girls, St. Vincent Infant Asylum (at Race and Magazine Streets), and an asylum and church on Erato Street that became St. Theresa of Avila Church. She donated to the Protestant Episcopal Home as well and gave to Jewish charities in New Orleans. In her will she gave to the Seventh Street Protestant Orphan Asylum, the German Protestant Orphan Asylum, the German Orphan Catholic Asylum, the Widows and Orphans of Jews Asylum, and to the Daughters of Charity of St. Vincent de Paul, and many others.

The Sisters of Charity withdrew from Poydras Street at the end of 1836 and moved to a new location in New Levée Street, to what was considered a haunted house. It was vacant for many years and in a very poor state of repair. According to records, this was the first Catholic orphan asylum in New Orleans. It was Margaret's intention just to help the sisters get established. However, it was here that she found her true calling. She showed great energy and business acumen and was made manager of the institution. She confounded everybody by proving this location habitable, none more so than the landlord who promptly put the building up for sale. So, within two years, they were again seeking a home.

Margaret knew of a house on a deserted plantation not far away and managed to persuade the owner to give it rent-free. She succeeded in fulfilling her ambition to get the children out of the city and into the Louisiana countryside. They were taught to read and write, but also to sew; they were given general preparation for entering the outside world.

It was Margaret's great ambition to provide a permanent home for the orphans and in 1840 work on the St. Theresa's Asylum on Camp Street commenced. The site was donated by F. Saulet. Largely Margaret herself funded the project, but with help from a few others who gave donations as a result of her persuasion. Nevertheless, it took ten years to clear the debt and Margaret still supported the orphan asylum at the plantation at this time.

Around the mid-19th century, yellow fever was again rampant. The yellow scourge swept New Orleans. The epidemic of 1853 rendered thousands of children homeless. Margaret visited the homes of the sick Protestants, Catholics and Jews, blacks and whites alike, the Louisiana Creole people, New Orleanian "Americans" and immigrants. Such were the numbers of orphans she encountered that she embarked on a new project in the form of (as she called it) a baby house. All her profits were channelled into this new endeavour, which soon took form in the shape of the imposing St. Vincent Infant Asylum at Race and Magazine streets, which opened in 1862. It took sixteen years to clear the debt, a burden shouldered mainly by Margaret.

Other homes opened in the 1850s and 1860s included the Louise Home for working girls at 1404 Clio Street and the St. Elizabeth House of Industry at 1314 Napoleon Street. During the yellow fever epidemics in New Orleans, she visited the homes of the sick and dying, without regard to race or creed or religion, aiding the victims and consoling the dying mothers with the pledge to care for their children.

It is estimated that the amount Margaret gave to charity in one form or another was in the region of $600,000.

Dress 

Despite the vast sums at her disposal, philanthropist, businesswoman and social worker Margaret spent little on herself, and was reputed never to own more than two dresses – a plain one for everyday use, while on special occasions she wore a plain silk dress and mantle. At all times she wore a Quaker bonnet, which became something of a trademark.

Illness and death 

At the age of 69 Margaret contracted an incurable disease, the exact nature of which is not recorded. She lingered many months under the care of her friends, the Sisters of Charity. People of all classes and denominations visited her in this her last illness. The aristocratic of New Orleans knelt at her side. Pope Pius IX sent his blessing and a crucifix, which was presented to her by Father Hubert Thirion, Louisiana, a young French priest.
 
Margaret died on 9 February 1882. Her body was taken to St. Vincent Infant Asylum, where it was embalmed and laid in state. The funeral took place on the following Saturday morning. Her death was announced in the newspapers with blocked columns as a public calamity, and the city newspapers were edged in black to mark her death. Her obituary was printed on the front page of The Times-Picayune newspaper, the main paper in the city.

State funeral 

The funeral cortege assembled at the asylum included 13 priests, headed by Archbishop Napoléon-Joseph Perché (third Archbishop of New Orleans). New Orleans Mayor Benjamin Flanders led the funeral procession and two Lieutenant Governors of Louisiana were pallbearers, George L. Walton and W.A. Robertson. Thousands, including prominent politicians, businessmen, and other members of the clergy, attended her funeral.

Orphans from all the city's asylums were present, black and white, along with the historic Mississippi fire brigade (of which she was an honorary member) and nuns of numerous orders, as well as close friends and admirers. The streets, sidewalks, balconies, and windows were thronged with mourners. These included three generals, clergymen of all denominations, and city representatives. The cortege passed the New Orleans Stock Exchange at noon. Members suspended proceedings, left the room and came down to the sidewalk. St. Patrick's Church (New Orleans, Louisiana) was so thronged that the pallbearers had great difficulty getting the remains through the centre aisle.

Requiem Mass was celebrated by Most Reverend Monsignor Allen with Archbishop Perché reading the prayers after Mass. Her friend Father Hubert gave the sermon. She was buried in the same Saint Louis Cemetery No. 2 tomb with her great friend Sister Francis Regis, the Sister of Charity who died in 1862 and with whom Margaret co-operated in all her early work for the poor.

Margaret's will was filed for probate on the following Monday. In her will she left everything to charities, without distinction of religion, for widows, orphans, and the elderly. She left all her wealth to charities with the exception of the bakery, which she bequeathed to her foster son, Bernard Klotz.

When Margaret died and her will was read, the people found that, with all her giving, she had still saved a great deal of money, and she left every cent of it to the different orphan asylums of the city; each one of them was given something. Whether the orphanages were for white children or black, for Jews, Catholics, or Protestants, made no difference; for Margaret always said, "They are all orphans alike." Margaret's will was signed with a cross instead of a name as she never learned to read or write. Her signature was a poignant reminder of her humble beginnings, great business successes and mark on humanity, despite her inability to read or write.

Margaret Statue 

The people of New Orleans said, "She was a mother to the motherless; she was a friend to those who had no friends; she had wisdom greater than schools can teach; we will not let her memory go from us." So the idea of erecting a public monument to Margaret in the city arose spontaneously.

Almost immediately a committee was appointed to oversee the erection of a statue in Margaret's honour. A site was purchased between Camp, Prytania and Clio streets. Alexander Doyle, a young sculptor, was commissioned. The statue was fashioned from old photographs, first moulded in clay. This was sent to Italy where it was reproduced in Carrera marble. The statue was returned to New York from Italy after a time, but the commissioners of the monument declined to accept it, owing to imperfections in the marble. The sculptor at once procured another block and assured the commission that a perfect statue, according to model, would be shipped so as to reach New Orleans by May 1884.

The monument was unveiled on 9 July 1884, two years after her death, by children from every orphanage in the city. Ex-Governor Francis T. Nicholls delivered a speech, and also present were the lady commissioners, the executive committee, New Orleans Mayor J. Valsin Guillotte, members of the city council and many others. The statue cost $6,000 which was donated in nickels and dimes – "No large sums would be accepted." The statue bears one word only, her name, Margaret.  The statue of her was sculpted to resemble how she looked, sitting in her own office door, or driving in her own little cart.

(Doyle was to carve other prominent monuments in New Orleans.)

The little park in which Margaret's statue is erected is officially named Margaret Place. It has often been stated that this is the first public monument erected to a woman in the United States. It is the statue of a woman, sitting in a low chair or the era, with her arms around a child, who leans against her. Margaret wears thick shoes, a simple gingham dress, with her perennial shawl draped around her shoulders, and a bonnet; she is stout and short, and her face is a square-chinned Irish face; but her eyes look at you like your mother's.

The small park is located where Camp and Prytania Streets meet in New Orleans. The poignant and beloved statue of a middle-aged woman seated in a chair with a small child nearby bears a plaque of one word: "Margaret."

At the time, Margaret's statue was thought to be the first monument to be erected in the United States in honour of a woman. As one leading New Orleans newspaper editorial put it, “She was the most deservedly eminent, the most justly famous, of all the women of New Orleans, of our generation or of any other, in the whole history of the city.”

Many still hail Margaret's sculpture as the first American statue of a notable woman. Officially, it is the second US monument to honour a woman, as the 1879 monument on Dustin Island in New Hampshire to Hannah Dustin (who in 1697 killed nine of her sleeping Indian captors and escaped) antedates Margaret's monument by five years, and was privately erected by her family on private property. However, Margaret's monument is the first publicly erected statue of a woman in the United States, the first monument to an American female philanthropist, and the only known statue to a baker.

Renewed interest in Margaret 

An Ireland-based group called the "Margaret of New Orleans Tully Committee" is reconstructing Margaret's Irish birthplace cottage, using original stone. The group is dedicated to raising awareness about Margaret and her life's work.

A full-length documentary film about Irish-born American heroine, Margaret, is currently in production,  Who is Margaret Haughery? And why don't you know who she is? It will contain interviews with historians, including the author of the 1996 biography: Margaret: Friend of Orphans, Mary Lou Widmer.  The documentary is introduced by former United States Ambassador to the Vatican, Corinne Claiborne "Lindy" Boggs.

In 2009 the Leitrim Youth Theatre Company, Carrigallen, Ireland, mounted the first known live-theatre production of Margaret's life story. The stage performance "Our Story of Margaret of New Orleans" featured original music and songs.

The Ogden Museum of Southern Art obtained a Jacques Amans original portrait of Margaret.

Other 

Of the three older Gaffney family children left behind in Ireland (Thomas, Mary and Annie) when young Margaret and her parents, along with an infant and one brother, in 1819 set sail for America; for the rest of Margaret's life of tragedy and triumph – of service and charity to others, orphans and windows in particular – she only reunited with her remaining foreign-soil siblings once, when elder brother Thomas visited her in New Orleans in 1857.

Although first entombed at St. Louis Cemetery No. 2 with Sister Regis, the Sisters of Charity communal tomb was later moved to a circa 1971 mausoleum vault at St. Louis Cemetery No. 3, located on Esplanade Avenue in New Orleans. Margaret along with her dear friend Sister Regis, and each Sister of Charity who died prior to 1914, are listed on two plaques; Margaret's St. Louis Mausoleum final resting place is an unmarked Vault numbered 18A, located on Mary Magdalene Corridor.

New Orleans, Louisiana Archbishop Perché in his 1882 eulogy to Margaret said, "I have already been asked whether Margaret Haughery, who lived and labored so long and well amongst us, was a saint. It is not for me to make a pronouncement. But, if you put this same question to yourselves, dear brethren, you may find an answer similar to that which a little boy once made when a sister in our Sunday school enquired that somebody define a saint. 'I think' said the child, remembering the human figures in stained glass windows, 'that a saint is one who lets the light shine through.'”

References

Sources
LSU, Louisiana Leaders, Notable Women in History, Margaret Haughery
Civil War Woman: Margaret Haughery
Strousse, Flora. Margaret Haughery: bread woman of New Orleans. P.J. Kenedy 1st ed 1961
New Orleans Past, Art in New Orleans, Margaret Haughery
Old New Orleans Journal, Margaret Haughery
Gehman, Mary and Ries, Nancy. Women and New Orleans A History. New Orleans, LA: Margaret Media, Inc. 1996
Famous Americans, Margaret Haughery
Find a Grave, Margaret Haughery
Carrington Bouve, Pauline. American Heroes and Heroines. Kessinger Publishing 2006
Jumonville, Florence M. Louisiana History: An Annotated Bibliography (Bibliographies of the States of the United States). Greenwood Press 2002
The Anglo-Celt, 2009
Carrigallen.com
Margaret of New Orleans Tully Committee
Roots Web, Irish-American-L Archives, Margaret Haughery
Widmer, Mary Lou. Lace Curtain. Ace Books 1985
Yellow Fever Deaths in New Orleans, 1817–1905
Neihaus, Earl F. The Irish in New Orleans, 1800–1860 (The Irish Americans). Arno Press 1976
Gaust, Edwin S. and Noll, Mark A. Documentary History of Religion in America since 1877. Wm. B. Eerdmans Publishing Company, 3rd ed. 2003
A. C. G. Margaret Haughery. Demorest 1885
Louisiana State Museum
Genealogy Bank Historical Newspapers of the 1800s until present day.
angelofthedelta.org

Bibliography 

 Saxon, Lyle "Gumbo Ya Ya: Folk Tales of Louisiana"  Pelican Publishing Company 1987
 Leavitt, Mel "Great Characters of New Orleans" Lexikos 1984.
 Martinez, Raymond J. "The Immortal Margaret Haughery" Industries Publishing Agency 1956. Hope Publications; revised edition 1967.
 Stuart, Bonnye E. "More than petticoats. Remarkable Louisiana women" Globe Pequot 2009.
 Widmer, Mary Lou, "Margaret, Friend of Orphans" Pelican Publishing Company 1996.
 Clark, Margaret Varnell "The Louisiana Irish" iUniverse, Inc. 2007.

People from New Orleans
1813 births
1882 deaths
19th-century Irish people
People from County Leitrim
19th-century American philanthropists